Cuprona is a locality and small rural community in the local government area of Central Coast, in the North West region of Tasmania. The Blythe River forms the western boundary. The 2016 census determined a population of 120 for the state suburb of Cuprona.

History
The early postal name for the locality was "Ellenton". It was changed to Cuprona in 1906.

Road infrastructure
The C117 route (Cuprona Road) runs from the Bass Highway through the locality, from where it provides access to many other localities further south.

References

Localities of Central Coast Council (Tasmania)
Towns in Tasmania